The 2009–10 season will be Ferencvárosi TC's105th competitive season, 1st consecutive season in the Borsodi Liga and 110th year in existence as a football club.

Transfers

Summer

In:

Out:

Source:

Winter

In:

Out:

Source:

Competitions

Overview

Nemzeti Bajnokság I

League table

Results summary

Results by round

Matches

Hungarian Cup

League Cup

First Group Stage

Table

Matches

Second Group Stage

Table

Matches

Statistics

Appearances and goals
Last updated on 2 May 2010.

|-
|colspan="14"|Youth players:

|-
|colspan="14"|Out to loan:

|-
|colspan="14"|Players no longer at the club:

|}

Top scorers
Includes all competitive matches. The list is sorted by shirt number when total goals are equal.
Last updated on 2 May 2010

Disciplinary record
Includes all competitive matches. Players with 1 card or more included only.

Last updated on 2 May 2010

Clean sheets
Last updated on 2 May 2010

References

External links
 Official Website
 UEFA
 fixtures and results

2009-10
Hungarian football clubs 2009–10 season